Kay Tagal Kang Hinintay (International title: The Long Wait / ) is a Philippine soap opera, produced by ABS-CBN and Star Cinema. It started on July 8, 2002, and ended on November 14, 2003, replacing Your Honor. The critically-acclaimed drama won the CMMA Best Drama Series and the PMPC Star Awards Best Primetime Drama Series. It is the first Philippine soap opera that nominated to the Best Drama Series category of the International Emmy Awards.

The series was re-aired internationally in 2012 via Cinema One Global 8 years after its release and its first re-run in 2004 on the same channel. On January 17, 2022, the series re-airs internationally and is available via iWantTFC with a total of 130 episodes.

The series is streaming online on YouTube.

Plot
Lorrea and Lorrinda Guinto (Lorna Tolentino) are twins.  Lorrea accidentally takes the place of her twin sister in the world of the drug lords.  After many trials and tribulations she finds her missing son, Andrei/Yuri (John Lloyd Cruz).

Plot and synopsis

The story revolves on twins Lorrea and Lorrinda Guinto (both portrayed by Lorna Tolentino). Lorrea grows up feeling abandoned by her mother (Perla Bautista) who loves Lorrinda more. Lorrea does all that she can to save her family from a series of events that threaten to tear the family apart. This includes her rape at the hands of Francis Ventaspejo (Ricky Davao) who lives in the same village and hometown. Lorrea has a child and names him Andrei but loses him. She tries to get him back but is, in the process, blamed for murdering Francis' father. A remorseful Francis enters the seminary and becomes a priest.

As she is thrown in jail by the powerful family Lorrea comes face to face with Lorrinda who offers to help her escape. To do so, Lorrea must enter the world of the drug lords and as a step mother and wife to Henri Argos (Edu Manzano) a powerful and influential character, and meets Brigitta (Bing Loyzaga), an associate of Henri who secretly has feelings for him. Lorrea turns into Lorrinda, known to the people of the underworld as "Red Butterfly" or "Red". She is also plunged into meeting a long lost love Boris Archangel (John Estrada) the man that Lorrea and Lorrinda once loved, who works for Henri as his right-hand man.

Her son Andrei grows up as Yuri Orbida (John Lloyd Cruz) the son adopted by Mirdo Orbida (Ronnie Lazaro) whom he grows to love as a real father. Yuri becomes accepted at a new school in Manila and meets Helaena Argos (Rica Peralejo) at the university; the two meet and form a bond. Helaena falls for Yuri, to the dismay of Kayla (Dimples Romana) Yuri's childhood friend and even crush. Meanwhile, Yuri and his childhood friend Ivan (Jhong Hilario) reunite. Ivan's adoptive mother dies in suicide and Ivan retaliates by revealing to Lorrea that her son Andrei died.

Henri Argo's criminal empire is ruined, Yuri vows revenge upon "Red" for killing his adoptive father, Kayla is attacked, and the truth is finally revealed about Henri being the drug lord, syndicate, leaving the family penniless. Helaena is heartbroken after overhearing Yuri's true feelings for her and his true love for Kayla. Helaena, a longtime love of Anilov Mijares (Bernard Palanca), eventually tries to support her family and becomes a prostitute.

Lady Morganna (Jean Garcia), Brigitta's evil sister and now Boris' wife, enters the picture and plans to make "Red's" family all suffer. Helaena is connected to Anilov and has sessions with him as Mister X, an Alter Ego. Unknown to Yuri is that Dimitri (Johnny Delgado), who was once his professor and taught him law, is the one who is also connected to his plans for revenge. He grows to hate Anilov for not stopping his older sister who eventually dies overdosing on a drug made by Henri's family.

After 8 years, Lorrea is still alive and Lady Morganna's old enemies resurface. Yuri falls for Katrina (Bea Alonzo) Henri's younger daughter who has just finished becoming a lawyer the two eventually fall in love. Kayla is successful as well but suffers from jealousy. Dimitri adopts Yuri and takes him under his wing. On the other hand, Lady Morganna becomes insane and eventually tries to shoot Lorrea, but shoots Boris instead. Yuri is unwilling to forgive Lorrea because there is not enough proof to make him believe she is the real Lorrea and not Lorrinda. Lorrea's face is fixed after surgery after the bomb explosion that is planted by Lady Morganna. The real Lorrinda/"Red Butterfly" is alive having suffered from a head trauma and amnesia after the bombing in the jail. Lorrinda then defends her twin and says that the series of events that took place will truly reveal that everything was staged and that everything was her fault. Yuri then accepts the truth. Helaena and Anilov marry and have a child while Lorrea takes care of Alyssa, both Lady Morganna and Boris' child. Lady Morganna takes full responsibility for all the attempts and killings, and later on commits suicide in jail due to the guilt for Boris' death. Yuri becomes a law lecturer in a university and accepts Lorrea and Francis as his parents and all is forgiven.

Cast
Main cast
 Lorna Tolentino portrays two roles:
 Lorrea Guinto / Lea Mijares - (the female protagonist) is the good twin trying to find her lost son Andre. 
 Lorrinda Guinto / Ingrid Medrano / Red Butterfly -  (the female antagonist) has always wanted more than life had to offer for her so she became a part of the drug syndicate and adopted the names Ingrid Medrano and Red Butterfly. They both fall in love with Boris.
Supporting cast
 John Lloyd Cruz as Yuri Orbida / Andre Guinto – The lost son of Lorrea. He grows up to be a lawyer and seeks justice for the deaths of his foster fathers. Carl John Barrameda portrays a young Yuri.
 Rica Peralejo as Helaena Argos – The eldest child of Henri Argos. She does everything in her power to raise her brother and sister after her father dies. She gets seriously hurt from her first love which is Yuri but will learn to love again with Anilov.
 John Estrada as Boris Arcangel – He becomes the man that both Lorrea and Lorrinda love. He becomes the right-hand man of Henri Argos.
 Edu Manzano as Henry Argos – Father of Helaena, Katrina, and Niko. One of the leaders of the drug syndicate.
 Jean Garcia as Lady Morgana Frost-Arcangel – The female antagonist of series. She will make Lorrea, Yuri, and the Argos children's lives miserable as hell.
 Ronnie Lazaro as Mirdo Orbida – The first foster father of Yuri who raised and taught him right from wrong up to his adolescent years.
 Johnny Delgado† as Dimitri Mijares – The father of Anilov and the second foster father of Yuri who educate him to a law school after Mirdo died.
 Bea Alonzo as Katrina Argos – The middle child of Henry Argos. She grows up to be a lawyer and falls for her sister's first love.
 Bernard Palanca as Anilov Mijares – Son of Dimitri but they do not get along. He does the exact opposite of what his father wants even when it comes to his personal life.
 Dimples Romana as Kayla "Pards" Reneza – She is the childhood friend of Yuri and loves him from a far.
 Bing Loyzaga as Brigitta – She pretends to be a caring friend to Henri but underneath of it is the will to do anything to be his one true love. The older sister of Morgana. Miss Bing Loyzaga delivers a powerful and unforgettable performances that deserves multiple international acting awards.
 Ricky Davao as Francis Ventaspejo – A struggling priest who tries to make up for all the mistakes he has done to Lorrea in the past. The biological father of Yuri.
 Shaina Magdayao as Guinevere "Gwenn" Martinez – The foster child of Lorrea.
 Alwyn Uytingco as Nikolai "Nikos" Argos – The youngest Argos child and the closest to Lorrea.
 Jhong Hilario as Ivan – Childhood friend to Yuri.

 Recurring cast
 Rafael Rosell as Tiborce – He is the man who Kayla married despite her love to Yuri.
 Andre Tiangco as Father Lorenz – He stood as Francis' spiritual voice of reason while  Lorrea was recuperating from the blast that destroyed her face.
 Ariel Reonal and Don Rivera as the two young NBI agents – Assisted Boris in tracking down a list of people suspected to be connected to Dimitri's death.
 Jennylyn Mercado as Aira
 Kathleen Hermosa as Erika
 Eunice Lagusad as Alyssa

 Guest cast
 Snooky Serna as Maida Ventaspejo
 Romeo Rivera as Don Feudor Ventaspejo
 Gloria Sevilla as Doña Tilda Ventaspejo

Additional information
This is the second series to be worked on by film arm Star Cinema after the success of Pangako Sa 'Yo and then Sana'y Wala Nang Wakas.
 A movie with the same title but different story was released in 1998. It stars Judy Ann Santos and the late Rico Yan.
 First TV drama of John Lloyd Cruz and Bea Alonzo as a loveteam. The two characters had a cross over with another TV drama Bituin in recurring episodes on 2003.
Edu Manzano's character was killed off due to his political campaign during that year. Jean Garcia was later introduced as Henry's arch enemy. After this series ended, Garcia had a follow-up project, It Might Be You, another series co-starring with Cruz and Alonzo. 
Veteran actresses Snooky Serna and Gloria Sevilla appeared on this series. 
Johnny Delgado was to star in a comedy series on GMA-7's short-lived sitcom All Together Now which killed his character off the show to pave the way for his next projects. He would later come back to ABS-CBN to star in Mga Anghel Na Walang Langit in 2005. 
Bing Loyzaga was tapped to play Brigitta because she received praise for some of her films and other series. 
Rica Peralejo was interviewed by Toni Gonzaga in addition to her questions, she says that the series was one of her favorites because she was given simultaneous roles she had to work also with her ex-reel and real life love-team partner Bernard Palanca. 
Lorna Tolentino was able to transition from film to TV roles after the success of her films, Abakada... Ina (2001) and Sugatang Puso (2000). Her winning streak continued when she was tapped to do Mano Po 2: My Home in 2002 before she was part of a dispute over the film Noon at Ngayon: Pagsasamang Kay Ganda which would reprise her role as Joey from the original film Moral, however she moved back to GMA-7. In 2009, Tolentino she made a comeback and worked with John Estrada in Dahil May Isang Ikaw. 
 Prior to her fame, StarStruck's first ultimate female survivor Jennylyn Mercado played a small part in this series.

References

External links
 

ABS-CBN drama series
2002 Philippine television series debuts
2003 Philippine television series endings
Television series by Star Creatives
Filipino-language television shows
Television shows set in the Philippines